Jhojan Humberto Dominguez Tasayco (born 9 July 2000) is a Peruvian footballer who plays as a winger for Comerciantes FC.

Career

Club career
Dominguez joined Deportivo Municipal from CD Pacífico in 2016. On 10 February 2020, Dominguez got his official debut for Municipal in the Peruvian Primera División against UTC Cajamarca. Dominguez was in the starting lineup on the left wing, but was replaced after 65 minutes.

On 1 May 2021, Dominguez was loaned out to Peruvian Segunda División club Unión Comercio for the rest of 2021. He was left without contract at the end of 2021. After a spell at CNI in 2022, Dominguez moved to Comerciantes FC at the end of November 2022.

References

External links
 

Living people
2000 births
Association football wingers
Peruvian footballers
Footballers from Lima
Peruvian Primera División players
Peruvian Segunda División players
Deportivo Municipal footballers
Unión Comercio footballers